Bayelsa Central Senatorial District in Bayelsa State, Nigeria covers four local governments of Kolokuma/Opokuma, Southern Ijaw and Yenagoa which is the state capital. This district has 43 Registration Areas (RAs) and 789 polling units (PUs). The collation centre is Yenagoa LGA Council Hall.

List of senators representing Bayelsa Central

References 

Politics of Bayelsa State
Senatorial districts in Nigeria